1825 in sports describes the year's events in world sport.

Baseball
Events
 "A baseball club, numbering nearly fifty members, met every afternoon during the ball playing season" in Rochester, New York, wrote Thurlow Weed in 1883 (Life of Thurlow Weed, vol. 1)

Boxing
Events
 19 July — Jem Ward takes the English Championship when he defeats Tom Cannon in the tenth round at Warwick.

Cricket
Events
 On Thursday 28 July, a schools match at Lord's between Harrow and Winchester having just concluded, the pavilion burns down overnight with the consequent loss of valuable scorecards, records and trophies
 Inter-county cricket is revived for the first time since 1796 with Sussex playing two matches each against Hampshire and Kent.  Hampshire and Kent do not play each other. 
England
 Most runs – Jem Broadbridge 552 (HS 135)
 Most wickets – Jem Broadbridge 31 (BB 6–?)

Horse racing
England
 1,000 Guineas Stakes – Tontine 
 2,000 Guineas Stakes – Enamel
 The Derby – Middleton
 The Oaks – Wings 
 St. Leger Stakes – Memnon

References

 
1825